Mouth to Mouth is a 1995 Spanish sex comedy film directed by Manuel Gómez Pereira. The cast, led by Javier Bardem, also features Aitana Sánchez-Gijón and Josep Maria Flotats.

Plot 
The aspiring actor Víctor Ventura has a night job at a phone sex agency. He gets to know a woman who wants more than just talking. The seductive Amanda drags him into an assassination plot and his dream of an acting career moves further into the distance.

Cast

Production 
Mouth to Mouth was directed by Manuel Gómez Pereira, who also wrote the screenplay together with Joaquín Oristrell, Naomi Wise and Juan Luis Iborra. The production companies were Sogetel,  and Star Line TV Productions.

Release 
The film was presented at the 28th Sitges Film Festival in October 1995, screened as part of the 'Premiére' selection dedicated to non-fantasy films. Distributed by Sony Pictures, the film was theatrically released in Spain in 1995. The film grossed 374.2 million ₧ in 1995. It was released by Miramax in the United States.

Awards and nominations 

|-
| align = "center" rowspan = "9" | 1996 || rowspan = "8" | 10th Goya Awards || colspan = "2" | Best Film ||  || rowspan = "8" align = "center" | 
|-
| Best Director || Manuel Gómez Pereira || 
|-
| Best Original Screenplay || Joaquín Oristrell, Juan Luis Iborra, Manuel Gómez Pereira, Naomi Wise || 
|-
| Best Actor || Javier Bardem ||  
|-
| Best Supporting Actor || Fernando Guillén Cuervo || 
|-
| Best Production Supervision || Josean Gómez || 
|-
| Best Editing || Guillermo Represa || 
|-
| Best Sound || Brian Saunders, Carlos Faruolo, James Muñoz || 
|-
| 51st CEC Medals || Best Actor || Javier Bardem ||  || align = "center" | 
|-
| align = "center" | 1998 || 13th Independent Spirit Awards || colspan = "2" | Best International Film ||  || 
|}

See also 
 List of Spanish films of 1995

References 
Citations

Bibliography

External links

1995 films
1990s Spanish-language films
Films directed by Manuel Gómez Pereira
Spanish sex comedy films
1990s sex comedy films
Films shot in Madrid
BocaBoca Producciones films
1990s Spanish films